Paula McCartney (born 1971) is an American artist known for her photographic works.

She holds a BFA degree from Empire State College, New York (1998), and an MFA degree from the San Francisco Art Institute (2002).

Her work is included in the collections of the Smithsonian American Art Museum, the Cleveland Museum of Art, the Walker Art Center and the Museum of Contemporary Photography.

References

1971 births
Living people
20th-century American women artists
21st-century American women artists
American women photographers
Empire State College alumni 
Photographers from Pennsylvania
San Francisco Art Institute alumni